Mihhail Stalnuhhin, russified as Mikhail Anatolyevich Stalnukhin (Russian: Михаил Анатольевич Стальнухин; born 15 September 1961, Tartu) is an Estonian politician, representing the Estonian Centre Party from 1996 to 2022. He is a member of the Riigikogu, representing Ida-Virumaa. He was also the chairman of the Narva City Council in 2003–2011 and the chairman of the Riigikogu state budget control committee in 2017–2019.

Education
Graduated from Tallinn University in 1995 with a degree in Estonian philology.

Politics 
Stalnuhhin has been a member of the Narva City Council on and off again, from 1994 to 1995, from 1999 to 2003, and, eventually, was the chairman of the City Council from 2003 to 2011. He has been a member of the Riigikogu on and off again since 1999. He initially was a member from 1999 to 2007, but withdrew from the Riigikogu in favor of being a part of the Narva City Council. He also applied for the 2011 Riigikogu elections, received 8,584 votes and was elected again. In the 2015 Riigikogu elections, he again received 3,648 votes in his constituency of Ida-Viru County, and became elected again.

He is the chairman of the Riigikogu state budget control committee.

He was a candidate for the 2014 European Parliament election in Estonia and received 11,550 votes, but was not elected. He was the third Centre Party candidate after Yana Toom and Edgar Savisaar.

At the beginning of 2013, Stalnuhhin was fined because he walked in Narva with a dog without a leash.

On 29 September 2015, the press reported that Stalnuhhin leased a Honda CR-V for his spouse Irina, whose expenses she paid with a payback allowance, for €744 a month. Stalnuhhin does not have a drivers license. Several Riigikogu members condemned Stalnuhhin's behavior, among them Speaker of the Riigikogu Eiki Nestor.

In 2015, the Estonian Taxpayers Association awarded Stalnuhhin the title of Taxpayer's Enemy.

In September 2022 Stalnuhhin was expelled from the Centre Party after calling members of the Government "fascists".

Works
 "Novellid", 1999
 "Eesti-vene õppesõnastik" koostöös E. Väljaga 1998
 "Vene-eesti õppesõnastik" koostöös E. Väljaga 1997
 "Eesti keel iseõppijale" I–III osa 1994–1996

References

External links
 Mihhail Stalnuhhin's website
 Stalnuhhin's profile on the Riigikogu website
 Стальнухин: Сила — не синоним анархии (29 April 2007, Delfi, in Russian)
 Russian mayor in the Republic of Estonia (in Russian)
 Maailm ei ole mustvalge, vaid värviline (in Russian)

1961 births
Estonian Centre Party politicians
Estonian people of Russian descent
Living people
Members of the Riigikogu, 1999–2003
Members of the Riigikogu, 2003–2007
Members of the Riigikogu, 2007–2011
Members of the Riigikogu, 2011–2015
Members of the Riigikogu, 2015–2019
Members of the Riigikogu, 2019–2023
People from Narva
Politicians from Tartu
Tallinn University alumni